John Lowell Burton (born December 15, 1932) is an American politician and attorney. He served as Chairman of the California Democratic Party from April 2009 until May 2017. A  professor of California Politics at San Francisco State University, he served in the California State Assembly (1965–74), in the U.S. House of Representatives (1974–1983), in the State Assembly again (1988–1996), and in the California State Senate (1996–2004) (representing the 3rd district). He was appointed to the San Francisco Port Commission in October 2020.

Personal life and education

Burton was born in Cincinnati, Ohio, the son of Mildred (Leonard) and Thomas Burton, who was a salesman and physician. 
He was raised in San Francisco. Burton earned a Bachelor of Arts degree in social science in 1954 from San Francisco State University and a Juris Doctor from the University of San Francisco School of Law.

Political career 
After graduating from law school, Burton worked as an attorney in San Francisco until he was elected to the California State Assembly in 1964. In 1973 and 1974, Burton served in his first stint as chair of the California Democratic Party. Burton also worked as a lobbyist for the Pacific Gas and Electric Company (PG&E).

From 1998 to 2004, he served as the President pro tempore of the State Senate. Prior to his time in the Senate, he served in the California State Assembly from 1965 to 1974, and again from 1988 to 1996. He was originally elected to the Assembly to succeed his older brother, Phil, who had been elected to Congress and had served as the majority whip. In April 1983, Phil died in office and was succeeded by his widow Sala Burton who won a special election that June. Sala served until her death in 1987 after which Nancy Pelosi won another special election to fill that seat. 

John Burton was returned to the Assembly in a 1988 special election to succeed Art Agnos, who had been elected Mayor of San Francisco. Burton also served in the U.S. House of Representatives, alongside his brother, after winning a special election outright in 1974, until 1982, when he retired. As a legislator, Burton was known for expanding the Cal Grant scholarship program, and passing a law (subsequently defeated in a referendum) that would have required California businesses to pay for health coverage for their workers. The magazine California Journal said about Burton's departure from the Senate in 2005: "Gone will be the Senate's most vehement partisan for social services for the poor, the Senate's angriest voice against tax breaks for businesses and the wealthy, its loudest voice for protection of workers, its fiercest pro-labor advocate and its disciplinarian."

Charitable work
After leaving the Senate, Burton formed the John Burton Foundation, an organization that, according to its website, is "dedicated to improving the quality of life for California’s homeless children and developing policy solutions to prevent homelessness."

In February 2007, he was appointed board member of the University of Phoenix.

In 2008, Burton settled an alleged sexual harassment lawsuit filed by Kathleen Driscoll, then the executive director of his charitable foundation. She claimed Burton sexually harassed her by making unwanted advances, suggestively raising his eyebrows and commenting on her body. At a 2008 news conference in her attorney's office, Driscoll said, "I had a dream of helping homeless children through a job I loved. John Burton turned that dream into a sexual harassment nightmare and quite frankly a living hell." Burton's attorney, Susan Rubenstein, quickly countered, saying, "John Burton has dedicated approximately a half-century of his life to public service, and if he were a sexual harasser, I think it would have been unearthed by now." "I think the allegations are shocking and a shakedown and are absolutely meritless." Within hours Rubenstein received information that Driscoll had written or said complimentary things about Burton that contradicted her allegations. In a June 2007 e-mail to another foundation employee, Driscoll had written, "I love John because his heart is so good and pure." Rubenstein continued, "I just got off the phone with another [person] who felt compelled to tell me that she had lunch with Driscoll and she said Driscoll had nothing but admirable things to say about Mr. Burton."

Party leadership (2009-2017) and aftermath
On April 26, 2009, Burton was elected chair of the California Democratic Party, succeeding Art Torres. He received roughly 76% of the vote, over his sole challenger, Chris Finnie of Santa Cruz.

Burton stepped down from his party chairmanship in May 2017. He was succeeded by vice chairman Eric Bauman. At his farewell, he recalled a lesson learned early in life. Near tears he described walking in San Francisco with his father, who doled out whatever money he had to the poor. When John asked why, Burton recalled, "He put his finger in my face and told me he never ever wanted me to walk past some guy in bad circumstances without leaving something in the cup." Burton continued, "That's what Democrats do. …There’s a lot of people out there that if we don’t fight for them, nobody’s going to fight for them because they don’t have any power."

After promoting expanded medical care for Californians, he was extolled in a video and by a long line of effusive party luminaries. He was applauded for his decades-long leadership, leading protests against the Vietnam War, his support of Central Valley farmworkers, the homeless, and the needy. He finally ended his comments by raising both middle fingers and saying, "Fuck Trump," to a loud consensus.

San Francisco Port Commission 
Burton was appointed to the San Francisco Port Commission on October 22, 2020 by Mayor of San Francisco London Breed.

Personal life 
Burton was previously married to Michele Burton, a healthcare consultant. Their daughter, Kimiko Burton, served as San Francisco Public Defender from 2001 to 2003, and currently serves as a member of the California State Personnel Board.

References

External links

John L. Burton for Democratic Party Chair, burton2009.com; accessed May 22, 2019.
"Our Man in Sacramento" (2002), San Francisco Chronicle; accessed January 7, 2018.
 Burton used mastery of politics in long career, San Diego Union-Tribune, December 5, 2004.
  (1980-1990's)
 (2000's)

1932 births
Living people
Democratic Party members of the United States House of Representatives from California
University of San Francisco School of Law alumni
Democratic Party California state senators
Democratic Party members of the California State Assembly
California Democratic Party chairs
San Francisco State University alumni
Politicians from San Francisco
Politicians from Cincinnati
21st-century American politicians